"The 100 Greatest Artists of All Time" is a special issue published by the American magazine Rolling Stone in two parts in 2004 and 2005 and updated in 2011. The list presented was compiled based on input from musicians, writers, and industry figures and is focused on the rock & roll era.

The publication features comments written by musicians about their favorite colleagues (e.g., Elvis Costello on the Beatles, Janet Jackson on Tina Turner, etc.). Since its publication, the list has been frequently cited by many specialized and generalist publications.

Background
The list, published in two issues in 2004 and 2005 and updated in 2011, was based on the choices of a panel of 55 musicians, writers, and industry figures. As the editors explain, the artists were selected by "their peers", and the list aims to be "a broad survey of rock history", encompassing rock and roll, blues, hard rock, heavy metal, indie rock, rap and contemporary pop.

List statistics
In both versions of the list, the top three positions are held by the Beatles, Bob Dylan, and Elvis Presley; rounding out the top ten (in descending order) are the Rolling Stones, Chuck Berry, Jimi Hendrix, James Brown, Little Richard, Aretha Franklin, and Ray Charles.

In 2011, Rolling Stone published a revised edition of the list, with position changes from the 27th position onward. The updated list also features artists not present in the original (Queen, Metallica, Pink Floyd, Talking Heads, R.E.M., Tom Petty, Creedence Clearwater Revival and Jay-Z), while removing others (Etta James, Louis Jordan, Lee "Scratch" Perry, Miles Davis, Roxy Music, N.W.A., Ricky Nelson and Martha & The Vandellas).

The list consists primarily of American or British artists, as well as the following: AC/DC (Australian, with several British-born members), The Band (Canada/US), Bob Marley (Jamaica), Joni Mitchell (Canada), Lee "Scratch" Perry (Jamaica; only in the 2005 list), Carlos Santana (Mexican by birth, naturalised American), U2 (Ireland, with two British-born members) and Neil Young (Canada).

Most artists on the list were active in the 1960s and 1970s.

See also
 List of best-selling music artists
 The 100 Greatest Songwriters of All Time, also from Rolling Stone magazine
 The 500 Greatest Albums of All Time, also from Rolling Stone magazine
 The 500 Greatest Songs of All Time, also from Rolling Stone magazine

References

External links
100 Greatest Artists of All Time, Rolling Stone

Lists of musicians
Rolling Stone articles